Amphisbaena crisae is a species of worm lizards found in Brazil.

References

crisae
Reptiles described in 1997
Endemic fauna of Brazil
Reptiles of Brazil
Taxa named by Paulo Vanzolini